WVVX-LP (101.1 FM) is a radio station licensed to serve the community of Providence, Rhode Island. The station is owned by Providence Community Radio. It airs a community radio format, and operates on the 101.1 FM frequency in a timeshare arrangement with WBRU-LP and WFOO-LP.

The station was assigned the WVVX-LP call letters by the Federal Communications Commission on January 2, 2018.

References

External links
 Official Website
 FCC Public Inspection File for WVVX-LP
 

VVX-LP
VVX-LP
Radio stations established in 2018
2018 establishments in Rhode Island
Community radio stations in the United States
Providence County, Rhode Island